Grande Fratello 5 was the fifth season of Big Brother in Italy. The show was produced by Endemol and aired from 23 September 2004 to 2 December 2004.

In this season of Grande Fratello there were many new twists added to the game. A big added twist during this season was that four of the housemates were in a relationship with a fellow housemate. The four housemates were Francesco and Giulia who were married and Alfio and Rosa who were also married.

Housemates

Nominations table

Notes
 Housemate saved from eviction by the best of the weekly challenge.
: On Day 1, Big Brother nominated Alessandra and Veronica for eviction. In a twist, the other Housemates had to evict one of them, as opposed to one of them being evicted by a public vote.
: There were no nominations Week 1. Instead, Big Brother chose to automatically put Francesco and Rosa up for eviction.
: Due to Rosa surviving the eviction in Week 1, she earned herself immunity during Week 2's nomination process.
: Housemates were forced to nominate three Housemates this week.
: Annalisa and Pierre entered the House on Day 47 with the stipulation that one of them would have to leave the House on Day 50. This was dependent on if a male or female left the House through Week 7's second public vote. If a female were to be evicted, Pierre would be evicted as well. If a male were to be evicted, Annalisa would then be evicted. Because Rosa was evicted on Day 50, Pierre was evicted immediately after her.
: This week the public voted to win, rather than to evict.

TV Ratings

Sources
 World of Big Brother

References

2004 Italian television seasons
05